KOLT (690 AM) is a radio station broadcasting a news/talk format. Licensed to Terrytown, Nebraska, United States, the station is owned by the Nebraska Rural Radio Association.

History
On March 15, 2017, the then-KOAQ changed their format from regional Mexican to classic country, branded as "Country Legends".  (info taken from stationintel.com)

Ownership
In May 2013, Armada Media and Legacy Broadcasting traded some stations in Nebraska, with two stations in Holdrege (KUVR/1380 and KMTY/97.7) going to Legacy and eight others in the Scottsbluff and North Platte markets [KZTL/93.5 (Paxton-North Platte) and KRNP/100.7 (Sutherland-North Platte)  KOAQ/690 (Terrytown), KOLT/1320 (Scottsbluff), KMOR/93.3 (Gering), KETT/99.3 (Mitchell), KOZY-FM/101.3 (Bridgeport), KHYY/106.9 (Minatare)] going to Armada Media. A purchase price was not announced.
The station was eventually sold to the Nebraska Rural Radio Association.

Previous logos

References

External links
KOAQ Facebook Page

OLT (AM)
Radio stations established in 1961
1961 establishments in Nebraska
News and talk radio stations in the United States